Abundius (fl. 451 – 469) was a saint and bishop of Como, Italy.

Abundius is also the name of:
Abundius and Irenaeus (died 258), saints and martyrs
Abundius and Abundantius (died 304), saints martyred north of Rome in the Diocletian persecution
Abundius of Umbria (died 303), saint martyred north of Rome in the Diocletian persecution
Abundius the Sacristan (died 564), saint and sacristan of St. Peter's Basilica
Abundius of Córdoba (died 854), 9th century priest, martyr, and saint of Córdoba, Spain
Abundius of Pietra Montecorvina, saint and martyr of Pietramontecorvino in Apulia
Abundius of Palestrina, Italian saint

See also
Saint Abundantia (died 804), Christian saint
Abundantius, the name of several Christian saints